Ticona is an unincorporated community in Eden Township, LaSalle County, Illinois, United States. Ticona shares a ZIP code with Tonica. Ticona was a stop on the Burlington Railroad's Illinois Valley and Northern line between LaSalle and Streator. The railroad constructed a depot, stock yards, water tank, and small grain elevator. The Columbia Hotel of Streator built a small dancing pavilion and beer garden called Columbia Park in the woods near the depot. During a large party, a violent storm hit with lightning killing a man and destroying the park. Also noted for an amateur hypnotist accidentally sending a family to sleep in 1902.

References

Unincorporated communities in Illinois
Unincorporated communities in LaSalle County, Illinois
Ottawa, IL Micropolitan Statistical Area